198th may refer to:

198th Airlift Squadron flies the C-130 Hercules
198th Battalion (Canadian Buffs), CEF, a unit in the Canadian Expeditionary Force during the First World War
198th Division (People's Republic of China), a military formation of the People's Volunteer Army during the Korean War
198th Infantry Brigade, was first formed as part of the United States Army Reserve's 99th Division

See also
198, the year 198 (CXCVIII) of the Julian calendar